Deportivo Toluca Fútbol Club Premier is a professional football team that is playing in the Mexican Football League. They are playing in the Liga Premier (Mexico's Third Division) – Serie B after securing promotion from Liga TDP. Deportivo Toluca Fútbol Club Premier is affiliated with Deportivo Toluca F.C. who plays in the Liga MX. The games are held in the city of Metepec in the Estadio Instalaciones de Metepec.

History
On July 14, 2015, Liga MX announced that all 18 clubs to have a team in the Segunda Division. After missing the filial playoffs three of the first 4 torneos, on December 17, 2017, they earned their first title after beating Tigres & Pumas Premier in the Quarterfinals and Semis, respectively on away goals and Morelia Premier in the final. On June 30, 2019, Toluca and 4 other teams (the remaining clubs in League) dissolved.

After being dissolved for two years, On June 19, 2021, Toluca "B" (Liga TDP) won the zone B semifinals against Tuxpan FC in penalty shootout and earned promotion to the Liga Premier, once again. But, a week later they lost the Zone B Final by Fuertes de Fortin and confirmed their participation in Serie B.

Players

Current squad

References

 
Toluca
Liga Premier de México